Michael of Massa (Michael Beccucci de Massa) (died 1337) was an Italian Augustinian Hermit and theologian. He is known both as a scholastic philosopher and as an author of contemplative works.

He wrote a Sentences commentary, probably through the 1320s and 1330s, and left unfinished.

His Vita Christi was a major influence on the more famous work of the same name by Ludolph of Saxony.

References
William J. Courtenay, The Quaestiones in Sententias of Michael de Massa, OESA. A Redating, Augustiniana 45 (1995), 191-207
Jorge J. E. Gracia, Timothy B. Noone, A Companion to Philosophy in the Middle Ages (2003), p. 443

Notes

External links
 List of works

1337 deaths
Augustinian friars
14th-century Italian Roman Catholic theologians
Scholastic philosophers
Year of birth unknown
14th-century Latin writers